Kjetil Osvold (born 5 June 1961 in Ålesund) is a retired Norwegian footballer. Between 1984 and 1989 he scored 2 goals in 37 caps for Norway. On club level he played for Start, Lillestrøm, Nottingham Forest, Leicester City, Djurgården, PAOK og Skeid.

A midfielder was known for his technical abilities, he performed a nutmeg on legend player Diego Maradona in a 1986 friendly match. People also remembered him for hitting the stadium clock on Åråsen stadium from a corner kick.

References

Norwegian footballers
Norway international footballers
Nottingham Forest F.C. players
Leicester City F.C. players
Djurgårdens IF Fotboll players
Lillestrøm SK players
PAOK FC players
Eliteserien players
Allsvenskan players
Super League Greece players
Sportspeople from Ålesund
Expatriate footballers in England
Norwegian expatriate sportspeople in England
Expatriate footballers in Sweden
Norwegian expatriate sportspeople in Sweden
Expatriate footballers in Greece
Norwegian expatriate sportspeople in Greece
1961 births
Living people
Norwegian expatriate footballers
Association football midfielders